The Price is an unreleased British-American thriller film directed and written by Siofra Campbell. The film stars Noomi Rapace, Michael Shannon and Matthias Schweighöfer.

Cast 
 Noomi Rapace as Claire, Liam’s wife and Jonas’s mother
 Michael Shannon as Liam, Claire’s husband and Jonas’s father
 Matthias Schweighöfer as Jonas, Liam and Claire’s son

Production 
Principal photography on the film began on January 4, 2016 in Amsterdam.

References

External links 
 

American thriller films
British thriller films
Films shot in Amsterdam
Unreleased American films
2010s unfinished films
2010s English-language films
2010s American films
2010s British films